Boban Apostolov (born 1984) is a Macedonian Multi-Platinum composer, songwriter, arranger and record producer.

Biography 
Boban Apostolov was born in 1984 in Yugoslavia. At the age of six, he began to play violin in the music school Ilija Nikolovski – Luj, continued his studies at the Music High school, Music Academy in Skopje and Berklee College of Music in Boston as Specialist Studio Production.

2009–2014 He was a part as production manager, Pro Tools and sound engineer in F.A.M.E'S Project – Orchestral Music Recording and Production company, specializing in Film, Television, Documentary, Video games, and Publishing.

Some of the projects he was involved in recording orchestral music for movies are: Hostel: Part III, Camus, Keryti, Zwart Water, Omaggio a Roma (casting Monica Bellucci), Ana Winter, Hostel 3, Marea de Arena, 2033, La Commanderie, Joseph et sa fille, Les colts de l'or noi, Sound of Noise, The Lost Medallion, and many more titles for productions like TF1, EMI Music, Universal, Canal+, National Geographic.

Boban is a founder of Loops Lab Media, Company specialized for creating professional Music Samples, Loops, Drum Kits, Construction Kits, and Stock Music

Since 2014 he is a Voting Member of the Grammy awards.

Discography

Singles

See also
 Music of the Republic of Macedonia

References

External links
 official website

1984 births
Living people
Musicians from Skopje
Macedonian male songwriters
Macedonian record producers